Lieutenant Earl "Tommy" Thomson (August 14, 1900 – July 1971) was an Olympic equestrian who won 5 medals during his international career. He was born in Cleveland.

Biography
Graduating from West Point in 1922, Thomson earned the Silver Star in World War II while he was serving as chief of staff to the 10th Mountain Division in Italy.

Trained under Harry Chamberlin, Thomson had an extremely successful equestrian Olympic career. He finished individually second, and won team gold, at his first Olympic competition in 1932.

At the 1936 Olympics, he won the team gold and individual silver in eventing on the legendary mare Jenny Camp, being one of the few riders, and the only American, to successfully negotiate the 4th obstacle on cross-country, a water jump. This obstacle included a 3' jump into the water and, for most of the competitors, they found that the footing on the bottom was slippery and it was much deeper than it looked. This obstacle created considerable controversy as the entire German team made it through, suggesting that the home team could have had prior knowledge regarding the footing.

In 1948, Thomson competed in the dressage competition with Pancraft to win the team silver (after the gold medal-winning Swedish team was disqualified due to one of its members being an enlisted man rather than an officer). This is, to-date, the highest team medal the US has won in dressage competition. That same year, he finished with the team gold medal on Reno Rhythm

He also served as the chef d'equipe for the eventing team at the 1960 Olympics in Rome, and was a judge at the 1952 Olympic Games.

Thomson died in July 1971 at the age of 70.

References
 Bryant, Jennifer O. Olympic Equestrian, A Century of International Horse Sport. Lexington, KY: Blood-Horse Publications, 2008

1900 births
1971 deaths
Sportspeople from Cleveland
Equestrians at the 1948 Summer Olympics
Equestrians at the 1936 Summer Olympics
Equestrians at the 1932 Summer Olympics
American male equestrians
Olympic silver medalists for the United States in equestrian
Olympic gold medalists for the United States in equestrian
American event riders
American dressage riders
United States Army officers
United States Army personnel of World War II
United States Military Academy alumni
Recipients of the Silver Star
Medalists at the 1948 Summer Olympics
Medalists at the 1936 Summer Olympics
Medalists at the 1932 Summer Olympics